Donna Klein Jewish Academy (also known as DKJA) is a private, Jewish, co-ed school in unincorporated Palm Beach County, Florida, near Boca Raton, for grades K–12. It is located on the Jewish Federation of South Palm Beach County 100-acre campus, along with other Jewish community services and institutions.

Notable alumni
Greg Joseph - Placekicker for the Minnesota Vikings of the National Football League

References

External links

http://jewishboca.org/

Jewish schools in the United States
Education in Palm Beach County, Florida
Private K-12 schools in Florida
Boca Raton, Florida
1979 establishments in Florida
Educational institutions established in 1979